Anthidium funereum is a species of bee in the family Megachilidae, the leaf-cutter, carder, or mason bees.

Distribution
Argentina
Chile

Synonyms
Synonyms for this species include:
Anthidium melanotrichum Friese, 1904
Anthidium bombiforme Friese, 1920
Anthidium aterrimum Friese, 1925
Anthidium ruizi Reed, 1930

References

funereum
Insects described in 1890
Hymenoptera of South America
Invertebrates of Chile
Invertebrates of Argentina